The Château de Quéribus (in Occitan Castèl de Queribús) is a ruined castle in the commune of Cucugnan in the Aude département of France. It has been listed as a monument historique by the French Ministry of Culture since 1907.

Queribus is one of the "Five Sons of Carcassonne", along with Aguilar, Peyrepertuse, Termes and Puilaurens: five castles strategically placed to defend the French border against the Spanish, until the border was moved in 1659.

It is sometimes regarded as the last Cathar stronghold. After the fall of Montségur in 1244, surviving Cathars gathered together in another mountain-top stronghold on the border of Aragon (the present border between the Aude and the Pyrénées-Orientales).

In 1255, a French army was dispatched to deal with these remaining Cathars, but they slipped away without a fight, probably to Aragon or Piedmont - both regions where Cathar beliefs were still common, and where the Occitan language was spoken.

Quéribus is high and isolated. It stands on top of the highest peak for miles around. In 1951, restoration work on the turret began and, between 1998 and 2002, a complete restoration of the castle was undertaken. The castle is now accessible to visitors.

The nearest village is Maury, Pyrénées-Orientales.

See also
Cathar castles
List of castles in France

Further reading 
  Langlois, Gauthier. Olivier de Termes, le cathare et le croisé (vers 1200-1274), Toulouse : Éditions Privat, 2001, 288 p. (Collection Domaine cathare).
  Poudou, Francis and Langlois (Gauthier), (dir.) - Canton de Tuchan et communauté de communes des Hautes Corbières, Narbonne : Fédération audoise Léo Lagrangre, 2003.

References

External links
 

Castles in Aude
Ruined castles in Occitania (administrative region)
Monuments historiques of Aude
Catharism